Durrës Street is a major street of Tirana, Albania. It is one of the most important street of western Tirana and runs west from the central Skanderbeg Square for several kilometres until it reaches the sea to the north of Durrës.

References

Streets in Tirana